Dattatraya Yeshwant Phadke was head of Electronics division at Tata Institute of Fundamental Research.
He was also the founder of the Indian Vacuum Society.

He was awarded the Padma Bhushan, third-highest civilian honour of India by the President of India, in 1972.

References

Marathi people
Recipients of the Padma Bhushan in science & engineering
Living people
Year of birth missing (living people)
Businesspeople from Mumbai